Viesca  is a town and seat of the surrounding municipality of the same name, located in the northern Mexican state of Coahuila. Named after the third governor of Coahuila and Texas, José María Viesca, Viesca had a population of 19,328 at the last census. Of this number 9,695 were men and 9,633 were women.

Economy
Viesca's primary economic activity was formerly a salt factory which provided most of the jobs in town. The factory was shut down in 1992. Today, the main workplaces are the auto parts assembly factories that still operate giving jobs for most of the economic activity.

Reference

Populated places in Coahuila
Pueblos Mágicos